Peter Cehlárik (born on 2 August 1995) is a Slovak professional ice hockey forward for Leksands IF in the Swedish Hockey League (SHL). He was selected by the Boston Bruins in the 3rd round (90th overall) of the 2013 NHL Entry Draft.

Playing career 
Cehlárik played four junior seasons in his native Slovakia before continuing his development in Sweden. He made his Elitserien debut playing with Luleå HF during the 2012–13 Elitserien season. He helped the team win the Champions Hockey League during the 2014–15 season.

After playing 132 games, adding 22 goals and 49 points throughout four seasons with Luleå, he signed a three-year, entry-level contract with the Boston Bruins on 16 June 2016. He made his NHL debut on 11 February 2017 against the Vancouver Canucks. He played 11 games for Boston Bruins before returning to Providence Bruins.

Cehlárik scored his first NHL goal on 18 November 2017 with the Bruins as the first Boston goal in a road game against the San Jose Sharks, in what would become a 3–1 Boston victory.

After Cehlárik was left off Boston's Return to Play roster as an impending restricted free agent from the Bruins, Cehlárik halted his North American career and signed a two-year contract with Swedish club, Leksands IF of the SHL, on 17 August 2020.

After a lone season in the Kontinental Hockey League (KHL) with Avangard Omsk in 2021–22, Cehlárik opted to move to Switzerland in agreeing to a two-year contract with EV Zug of the National League (NL) on 24 May 2022.

In the 2022–23 season, Cehlárik in a top-six scoring role, scored 6 goals and 24 points through 38 regular season games, before opting to leave Switzerland and immediately return to former club, Leksands IF of the SHL, signing a contract until 2026 on 8 February 2023.

Career statistics

Regular season and playoffs

International

Awards and honours

References

External links

1995 births
Living people
Asplöven HC players
Avangard Omsk players
Boston Bruins draft picks
Boston Bruins players
Luleå HF players
Leksands IF players
Ice hockey players at the 2022 Winter Olympics
Olympic ice hockey players of Slovakia
Medalists at the 2022 Winter Olympics
Olympic bronze medalists for Slovakia
Olympic medalists in ice hockey
Providence Bruins players
Slovak ice hockey left wingers
Slovak expatriate ice hockey players in Sweden
Sportspeople from Žilina
EV Zug players
Slovak expatriate ice hockey players in the United States
Slovak expatriate ice hockey players in Russia
Slovak expatriate ice hockey players in Switzerland